Gnathophis parini is an eel in the family Congridae (conger/garden eels). It was described by Emma Stanislavovna Karmovskaya in 1990. It is a marine, deep water-dwelling eel which is known from the Sala y Gomez Ridge, in the southeastern Pacific Ocean. It dwells at a depth range of 540–560 metres. The maximum known total length, based on a juvenile specimen, is 13.7 centimetres.

The species epithet "parini" refers to N.V. Parin.

References

parini
Fish described in 1990